The Torneig Internacional de Tennis Femení Solgironès Open Catalunya Ciutat de La Bisbal is a tournament for professional female tennis players played on outdoor clay courts. The event is classified as a $100,000+H ITF Women's Circuit tournament and has been held in La Bisbal d'Empordà, Spain, since 2016.

Past finals

Singles

Doubles

External links 
 ITF search
 Website

ITF Women's World Tennis Tour
Clay court tennis tournaments
Tennis tournaments in Spain
Recurring sporting events established in 2016